The following is a list of county roads in Hendry County, Florida.  All county roads are maintained by the county in which they reside.

County roads in Hendry County

References

FDOT Map of Hendry County, Florida
FDOT GIS data, accessed January 2014

 
County